R. Kumaraguru is an Indian politician from the All India Anna Dravida Munnetra Kazhagam and member of the Tamil Nadu Legislative Assembly from the Ulundurpet constituency. He has been elected as an member of legislative assembly for the third consecutive time since 2006 assembly elections.He defeated the Vijayakanth, founder of DMDK party during 2016 assembly elections.  He represents the Anna Dravida Munnetra Kazhagam party. As an AIADMK candidate in the 2006 elections, he was elected as a member of the Tamil Nadu Legislative Assembly from the Thirunavalur assembly constituency which was eliminated during the constituency reorganization. Later, 2011 to 2016 he contested the Ulundurpet assembly election for the Second time in 2016 and won as a member of the assembly. after 2016 to 2021 In this election, he defeated the leader of the opposition party, the leader of the DMDK Party of India, Vijayakanth. And Third time Winner of Tamilnadu Legislative Assembly in ulundurpet constituency.He later contested the Ulundurpet assembly constituency from 2021 to 2026 on behalf of All India Anna Dravida Munnetra Kazhagam against DMK and lost by a margin of 5,256 votes and 2.17%.

Posts

 He is a MLA from Tiruvavalur Assembly constituency  in the year of 2006.
 He is a MLA from Ulundurpet Assembly constituency in the year of 2011.
 He is a MLA from Ulundurpet Assembly constituency in the year of 2016.
 He is a District Party Secretary, All India Anna Dravida Munnetra Kazhagam, Kallakurichi District.
 He was elected as a member of the Board of Trustees of Tirumala Tirupati Devasthanam Tamilnadu for two years from 2019 to 2021.

Achievement 

 While he was a member of the board of trustees of Tirumala Tirupati Devastham , he arranged for the construction of a small Tirupati temple in the image of Tirupati at Ulundurpet by donating own land.
 Kallakurichi was created as a new district. 
 Due to his work, a new medical college was established in Kallakurichi district
 Asia's largest cattle park has been developed near Kallakurichi district.

Personal life 

 He was born on 30 July 1961 as the Fourth member of Mr. Ramasamy in the village of Ethakkal in  A.Chatanur Panchayat of Tiruppayer Post in Ulundurpet Taluk of Tamil Nadu.
 Spouse(s): Mayilmani Kumaraguru 
 Children's: One Son & One Daughter 
 Son: K.Namachivayam
 Daughter: Elakkiya
 Parents: E.Ramasamy (Father)
 Residence(s): Kandasamipuram(East), Ulundurpet, Kallakurichi District, Tamilnadu.

Elections contested and positions held

References

External links
 Election Commission of India. "2006 Election Statistical Repor t" (PDF). 12 May 2006
 Detailes Result 2011, Aseembly Election Tamil Nadu (PDF). Election Commission of Tamil Nadu (Report). 15 February 2017... 9 May 2021 
 "Assembly wise Candidate Valid Votes count 2016, Tamil Nadu" (PDF). www.elections.tn.gov.in. 30 Apr 2022  30 Apr 2022 
 https://www.thehindu.com/news/national/andhra-pradesh/new-ttd-trust-board-constituted/article29455809.ece in 25th Board Member Of TTD in Tirupati.



All India Anna Dravida Munnetra Kazhagam politicians
Living people
Year of birth missing (living people)
Tamil Nadu MLAs 2016–2021